Kenosha is a railroad station in Kenosha, Wisconsin, served by Metra's Union Pacific North Line. It is the northern terminus of the line, which runs south to the Ogilvie Transportation Center in Chicago. Because it is located outside the RTA’s jurisdiction, the service to the station is partially subsidized by the city of Kenosha. It is the northernmost station of the entire Metra system, making it the most northern station in the entire RTA network. As of 2018, Kenosha is the 135th busiest of Metra's 236 non-downtown stations, with an average of 345 weekday boardings.

It is the only passenger station in Kenosha County, since Amtrak's closest station is in Sturtevant.

The station is linked to Kenosha's streetcar system, which stops on the far side of the station's parking lot.

As of 2022, Kenosha is served by six trains in each direction on weekdays, by five inbound trains and seven outbound trains on Saturdays, and by three trains in each direction on Sundays. There is a small coach yard at Kenosha where trainsets are stored overnight and on weekends as well as a Union Pacific maintenance facility.

History

The station was opened in 1855 by the Chicago and Milwaukee Railway and was acquired by the Chicago and North Western Railway in 1869. The station served many C&NW trains such as the Twin Cities 400, Flambeau 400, Shoreland 400, Valley 400, and Peninsula 400. The last intercity passenger train stopped in Kenosha in 1971; since then it has only been used for commuter services. Other commuter services extended from Chicago into Wisconsin but were eventually discontinued. The KD Line ran from Kenosha to Harvard and closed in 1939. The Northwest Line had a branch to Williams Bay that was cut back to Lake Geneva in 1966 and discontinued north of the state line in 1975. The Milwaukee Road had commuter service to Walworth until 1982 when Fox Lake became the present northern terminal.

Though Kenosha Station pre-dates the Civil War, it was restored in the period between 2004 and 2006. Metra does not have a ticket office there, and the waiting room serves as dining area for a fast food restaurant.

Transit connections

Kenosha Streetcar
 Coach USA (Wisconsin Coach Lines) - Kenosha-Racine-Milwaukee Route

References

External links
Metra - Kenosha station
Kenosha and its train station - 150 years of mutual gain continue (TrainWeb)
Station House from Google Maps Street View

Metra stations in Wisconsin
Railway stations in the United States opened in 1855
Kenosha, Wisconsin
Former Chicago and North Western Railway stations
1855 establishments in Wisconsin
Union Pacific North Line